Pinufiidae is a family of sea slugs, specifically nudibranchs, marine gastropod molluscs, in the clade Nudipleura. There are no subfamilies in the Pinufiidae.

References 
Sea Slug Forum species list